Sebastian Swierk (born 15 January 1979) is an Australian former professional tennis player.

Swierk, a Polish-born South Australian, reached career best ranking of 376 in singles and 263 in doubles. In 2000 he partnered with Chris Rae in the men's doubles main draw of the Australian Open.

ITF Futures titles

Singles: (2)

Doubles: (3)

References

External links
 
 

1979 births
Living people
Australian male tennis players
Tennis people from South Australia
Polish emigrants to Australia